

Edmund Blaurock (12 October 1899  – 25 January 1966) was a general in the army of Nazi Germany during World War II who commanded several divisions.  He was  a recipient of the  Knight's Cross of the Iron Cross with Oak Leaves.

Between 29 March and 13 April 1945, Blaurock commanded the Infantry Division Ulrich von Hutten.

Awards and decorations
 Iron Cross (1914) 2nd Class (26 August 1918)
 Clasp to the Iron Cross (1939) 2nd Class (24 September 1939) & 1st Class  (24 October 1939)
 German Cross in Gold on 4 June 1944 as Oberst im Generalstab (in the General Staff) and commander of Grenadier-Regiment 320
 Knight's Cross of the Iron Cross with Oak Leaves
 Knight's Cross on 27 July 1944 as Oberst im Generalstab and commander of Grenadier-Regiment 320
 746th Oak Leaves on 19 February 1945 as Generalmajor and commander of 56. Infanterie-Division

References

Citations

Bibliography

 
 
 

1899 births
1966 deaths
Military personnel from Nuremberg
Lieutenant generals of the German Army (Wehrmacht)
People from the Kingdom of Bavaria
German Army personnel of World War I
Recipients of the clasp to the Iron Cross, 2nd class
Recipients of the Gold German Cross
Recipients of the Knight's Cross of the Iron Cross with Oak Leaves
German prisoners of war in World War II held by the United Kingdom
20th-century Freikorps personnel
German Army generals of World War II